The men's doubles tournament at the 1981 French Open was held from 25 May until 7 June 1981 on the outdoor clay courts at the Stade Roland Garros in Paris, France. Heinz Günthardt and Balázs Taróczy won the title, defeating Terry Moor and Eliot Teltscher in the final.

Seeds

Draw

Finals

Top half

Section 1

Section 2

Bottom half

Section 3

Section 4

References

External links
1981 French Open – Men's draws and results at the International Tennis Federation

Men's Doubles
French Open by year – Men's doubles